On Stranger Tides is a 1987 historical fantasy supernatural novel  by American writer Tim Powers. It was nominated for the World Fantasy Award for Best Novel, and placed second in the annual Locus poll for best fantasy novel.

On Stranger Tides takes place during the Golden Age of Piracy. It features real historical figures like Blackbeard, Stede Bonnet, and Woodes Rogers alongside fictional ones, as actors in the fictional John Chandagnac's quest to reclaim his inheritance and rescue an Englishwoman. Vodun magic is an important plot device.

The story was also the inspiration for the Monkey Island video game series by LucasArts and for the fourth installment in the Pirates of the Caribbean film series, Pirates of the Caribbean: On Stranger Tides.

Plot

In 1718, French puppeteer John Chandagnac sails to Jamaica on the British ship Vociferous Carmichael. He aims to confront his uncle Sebastian, who has apparently stolen a fortune that rightfully belonged to John's father and could have prevented his poverty-induced death. On board, he meets an Englishwoman named Elizabeth Hurwood, who complains that her erudite father Benjamin has abandoned his natural philosophy work and begun studying dark magic with her lecherous physician Leo Friend. The pirate sloop Jenny menaces the Carmichael, neutralizing its powerful cannons with vodun magic. Benjamin Hurwood and Friend begin shooting their fellow passengers, revealing them as allies of the pirates, as the assailants board and seize the Carmichael.

The pirates allow the passengers to leave on a rowboat, except for Beth, whom Hurwood requires for a vodun ritual, and Chandagnac, enrolled into the crew after wounding pirate captain Philip Davies. Not fond of long words, the pirates change John's name to Jack Shandy. The pirates head for New Providence Island to refit the Carmichael for piracy. On the way, they are captured by the Royal Navy, but Shandy breaks them out, thus ingratiating himself with the pirates. On New Providence, Shandy develops a proficiency for cooking and learns about vodun: unlike in the Old World, magic is very strong in the Caribbean, and pirates hire bocors to channel loas for healing, attacking and protection. Male and female sorcerers control different kinds of magic. Shandy also meets a rambling old sorcerer named Sawney, and develops an affection for Beth.

Hurwood has concluded an alliance with Blackbeard to lead him to the fabled Fountain of Youth in Florida, a powerful source of magic that will make Blackbeard immortal and allow Hurwood to resurrect his late wife — a process which involves evicting Beth's soul from her body. Davies and Shandy join him, fighting through a hostile, sentient jungle on the way. Davies defends himself from a curse by tossing enchanted soil into the air; Shandy takes note and saves some soil for himself. Shortly after he returns from the Fountain, Shandy finds that Friend has seized the Carmichael and abducted Beth. He gives pursuit in the Jenny, and fights off Friend's magical zombie crew, with assistance from the ghost ship Nuestra Señora de Lagrimas, which Friend accidentally summoned along with the ghost crew. Davies is killed and Hurwood takes Beth for himself after defeating Friend in a wizards' duel.

Not knowing where to find Beth, Shandy becomes a drunken wreck and accepts the King's pardon from Woodes Rogers, along with most of the pirates on New Providence, while Hurwood assumes a new identity as Ulysse Segundo and begins pirating. Meanwhile, Blackbeard is killed by the Navy, and Shandy receives an education in magic from old Sawney (actually a 200-year-old Juan Ponce de León) and a vision he gets after using the Fountain of Youth soil during a fight. A survivor of Segundo's raids relates the mannerisms of his undead crew, and Shandy recognizes them as the old Carmichael crew. Hearing that Segundo was last seen heading for Jamaica, Shandy sails on the Jenny, facing a storm and a mutiny on the way.

Using Sawney's cryptic tips—involving blood and the magic-dampening power of magnetized iron—he defeats Hurwood and destroys his wife's soul. In Jamaica, he barely escapes the Navy and fights his way to the house of Hurwood's accomplice, who turns out to be Sebastian. He frees Beth and makes his way to a harbor, where he is met by Blackbeard, now resurrected and assuming a new identity. Combining his male magic with Beth's female magic, he vanquishes Blackbeard and marries Beth. The book ends as he prepares for the voyage out of Jamaica.

Reception
Orson Scott Card states that the novel "is as good as storytelling ever gets," adding that "Powers writes in a clean, elegant style that illuminates without slowing down the tale. The story promises marvels and horrors, and delivers them all." David Langford wrote that On Stranger Tides "immediately hooks you and drags you along in sympathy with one central character's appalling misfortunes on the Spanish Main, [and] escalates from there to closing mega-thrills so determinedly spiced that your palate is left almost jaded."

Jack Adrian says that "Tim Powers has further refertilized the Sabatini swashbuckler," and describes the novel as a skillful blend of "high seas adventure with sorcery and black magic."

Influence on other works

Books
Kim Newman based the name of a vampire in his Anno Dracula series on the main character of On Stranger Tides.

Video games
Ron Gilbert has been widely quoted that the Monkey Island series of adventure games was inspired by Disneyland's Pirates of the Caribbean ride. However, he stated in a blog that the ride was mainly his inspiration for the ambience of the series, while his true inspiration was On Stranger Tides.

Films

Pirates of the Caribbean 

In 2007, after the successful opening weekend of the third Pirates of the Caribbean film, At World's End, Walt Disney Studios Chairman Dick Cook said he was interested in a fourth film. The Los Angeles Times also reported that Bruckheimer already had rights to a book that could end up as another installment, though had not confirmed what book it was. On September 11, 2009, Walt Disney Pictures announced that the fourth installment would be titled Pirates of the Caribbean: On Stranger Tides. The announcement had fueled speculation that the film would follow the plot of the novel. It was later revealed that while making the films, screenwriters Ted Elliott and Terry Rossio found Tim Powers' novel and brought it up to producer Jerry Bruckheimer as an idea to option the book for the new chapter. In a 2011 interview, Tim Powers stated that Disney wanted the film rights as early as before the release of the second Pirates film, Dead Man's Chest, though he thought they already used elements beforehand with skeletal pirates replacing zombies from his book.

In January 2010, Disney announced that the film would be released on May 20, 2011. Before the film began production, it was speculated that Jack Sparrow would replace Jack Shandy as the story's protagonist. Tim Powers stated that the Fountain of Youth would definitely be in the film because it was teased in At World's End, but also said that Sparrow and Shandy are "totally different characters", and that Hector Barbossa and Blackbeard might overlap. On March 22, 2010, Jerry Bruckheimer confirmed that both Barbossa and Blackbeard (portrayed by Ian McShane) would be in the film, with Blackbeard as the villain. Additionally, Penélope Cruz would play Angelica, Blackbeard's daughter.

While making the fourth film, screenwriter Terry Rossio stated Tim Powers' novel was an inspiration for characters, theme, settings, and basic storyline. He also stated that he and co-writer Ted Elliot had considered using Blackbeard and the Fountain of Youth in the story before reading the book, "but whenever you say those words, Powers' novel comes to mind. There was no way we could work in that field without going into territory Tim had explored." However, they denied that it would be a straight version of the novel: "Blackbeard came from the book, and in the book there is a daughter character, too. But Jack Sparrow is not in the book, nor is Barbossa. So I wouldn't call this an adaptation." Powers himself stated that he never consulted with the writers and initially thought they weren't using much of his book at all and aside from Blackbeard and the Fountain of Youth, it'll be a pleasant surprise if the movie involves anything else from the book; noting Angelica, mermaids, and adventures in London. Rossio stated that Blackbeard, Angelica, and the Fountain as examples of how they integrated Powers' book into the film.

Despite being very different, the film did have some references taken from the book. While stories of ships crewed by zombies were mentioned in the book, and Blackbeard's boatman was a zombie servant, the film features a zombie crew serving as Blackbeard's officers. Although Tim Powers stated mermaids were not in the novel, there was a brief reference to "suck-you-byes" as "female demons that weirdly and erotically occupied the last hours of men marooned on barren islands" in the fourth chapter of the book. In the film, mermaids appear to be siren-like; succubus took the form of a siren in real-world folklore. While Juan Ponce de León was alive in the novel, the film reveals Ponce de León as a skeletal corpse lying on a bed; the latter as a reference to the Disneyland ride. Unlike the novel, the Fountain of Youth was located on an unknown Caribbean island rather than Florida. Appearances include Blackbeard's dark magic, the Queen Anne's Revenge, and brief mentions of Hispaniola and Saint Dominique.

References

External links
 
 On Stranger Tides at Worlds Without End

1987 American novels
1987 fantasy novels
American fantasy novels adapted into films
Novels by Tim Powers
Novels set in the 1710s
Novels about pirates
Pirates of the Caribbean (film series)
American zombie novels
Cultural depictions of Blackbeard
Cultural depictions of Stede Bonnet